Artyom Mikhaylovich Abramov (born 16 March 1991) is a Russian football player who plays as an defender for KAMAZ Naberezhnye Chelny.

Club career
He made his debut in the Russian Second Division for FC Zvezda Ryazan on 5 August 2011 in a game against FC Spartak Tambov.

He made his Russian Football National League debut for FC Olimpiyets Nizhny Novgorod on 8 July 2017 in a game against FC Avangard Kursk.

References

External links
 
 

1991 births
Sportspeople from Nizhny Novgorod
Living people
Russian footballers
Association football defenders
FC Volga Nizhny Novgorod players
FC Volga Ulyanovsk players
FC Nizhny Novgorod (2015) players
FC Yenisey Krasnoyarsk players
FC Tom Tomsk players
FC KAMAZ Naberezhnye Chelny players
Russian First League players
Russian Second League players